This page lists all described species of the spider family Liphistiidae accepted by the World Spider Catalog :

Ganthela

Ganthela Xu & Kuntner, 2015
 G. cipingensis (Wang, 1989) — China
 G. jianensis Xu, Kuntner & Chen, 2015 — China
 G. qingyuanensis Xu, Kuntner & Liu, 2015 — China
 G. venus Xu, 2015 — China
 G. wangjiangensis Xu, Kuntner & Liu, 2015 — China
 G. xianyouensis Xu, Kuntner & Chen, 2015 — China
 G. yundingensis Xu, 2015 (type) — China

Heptathela

Heptathela Kishida, 1923
 H. aha Xu, Ono, Kuntner, Liu & Li, 2019 — Japan (Ryukyu Is.)
 H. amamiensis Haupt, 1983 — Japan (Ryukyu Is.)
 H. crypta Xu, Ono, Kuntner, Liu & Li, 2019 — Japan (Ryukyu Is.)
 H. gayozan Xu, Ono, Kuntner, Liu & Li, 2019 — Japan (Ryukyu Is.)
 H. helios Tanikawa & Miyashita, 2014 — Japan (Ryukyu Is.)
 H. higoensis Haupt, 1983 — Japan
 H. kanenoi Ono, 1996 — Japan (Ryukyu Is.)
 H. kikuyai Ono, 1998 — Japan
 H. kimurai (Kishida, 1920) (type) — Japan
 H. kojima Xu, Ono, Kuntner, Liu & Li, 2019 — Japan (Ryukyu Is.)
 H. kubayama Xu, Ono, Kuntner, Liu & Li, 2019 — Japan (Ryukyu Is.)
 H. mae Xu, Ono, Kuntner, Liu & Li, 2019 — Japan (Ryukyu Is.)
 H. otoha Xu, Ono, Kuntner, Liu & Li, 2019 — Japan (Ryukyu Is.)
 H. shuri Xu, Ono, Kuntner, Liu & Li, 2019 — Japan (Ryukyu Is.)
 H. sumiyo Xu, Ono, Kuntner, Liu & Li, 2019 — Japan (Ryukyu Is.)
 H. tokashiki Xu, Ono, Kuntner, Liu & Li, 2019 — Japan (Ryukyu Is.)
 H. uken Xu, Ono, Kuntner, Liu & Li, 2019 — Japan (Ryukyu Is.)
 H. unten Xu, Ono, Kuntner, Liu & Li, 2019 — Japan (Ryukyu Is.)
 H. yakushimaensis Ono, 1998 — Japan
 H. yanbaruensis Haupt, 1983 — Japan (Ryukyu Is.)

Liphistius

Liphistius Schiödte, 1849
 L. albipes Schwendinger, 1995 — Thailand
 L. batuensis Abraham, 1923 — Malaysia (mainland)
 L. bicoloripes Ono, 1988 — Thailand
 L. birmanicus Thorell, 1897 — Myanmar
 L. bristowei Platnick & Sedgwick, 1984 — Thailand
 L. buran Schwendinger, 2019 — Malaysia
 L. castaneus Schwendinger, 1995 — Thailand
 L. dangrek Schwendinger, 1996 — Thailand
 L. desultor Schiödte, 1849 (type) — Malaysia
 L. endau Sedgwick & Platnick, 1987 — Malaysia (mainland)
 L. erawan Schwendinger, 1996 — Thailand
 L. fuscus Schwendinger, 1995 — Thailand
 L. gracilis Schwendinger, 2017 — Malaysia (mainland)
 L. hpruso Aung, Xu, Lwin, Sang, Yu, H. Liu, F. X. Liu & Li, 2019 — Myanmar
 L. indra Schwendinger, 2017 — Malaysia (mainland)
 L. isan Schwendinger, 1998 — Thailand, Laos
 L. jarujini Ono, 1988 — Thailand
 L. johore Platnick & Sedgwick, 1984 — Malaysia (mainland)
 L. kanthan Platnick, 1997 — Malaysia
 L. lahu Schwendinger, 1998 — Thailand
 L. langkawi Platnick & Sedgwick, 1984 — Malaysia
 L. lannaianus Schwendinger, 1990 — Thailand
 L. laoticus Schwendinger, 2013 — Laos
 L. laruticus Schwendinger, 1997 — Malaysia
 L. linang Schwendinger, 2017 — Malaysia (mainland)
 L. lordae Platnick & Sedgwick, 1984 — Myanmar
 L. maewongensis Sivayyapram, Smith, Weingdow & Warrit, 2017 — Thailand
 L. malayanus Abraham, 1923 — Malaysia (mainland)
 L. marginatus Schwendinger, 1990 — Thailand
 L. murphyorum Platnick & Sedgwick, 1984 — Malaysia
 L. negara Schwendinger, 2017 — Malaysia (mainland)
 L. nesioticus Schwendinger, 1996 — Thailand
 L. niphanae Ono, 1988 — Thailand
 L. ochraceus Ono & Schwendinger, 1990 — Thailand
 L. onoi Schwendinger, 1996 — Thailand
 L. ornatus Ono & Schwendinger, 1990 — Thailand
 L. owadai Ono & Schwendinger, 1990 — Thailand
 L. panching Platnick & Sedgwick, 1984 — Malaysia (mainland)
 L. phileion Schwendinger, 1998 — Thailand
 L. phuketensis Schwendinger, 1998 — Thailand
 L. pinlaung Aung, Xu, Lwin, Sang, Yu, H. Liu, F. X. Liu & Li, 2019 — Myanmar
 L. priceae Schwendinger, 2017 — Malaysia (mainland)
 L. pusohm Schwendinger, 1996 — Thailand
 L. sayam Schwendinger, 1998 — Thailand
 L. schwendingeri Ono, 1988 — Thailand
 L. sumatranus Thorell, 1890 — Indonesia (Sumatra)
 L. suwat Schwendinger, 1996 — Thailand
 L. tanakai Ono & Aung, 2020 — Myanmar
 L. tempurung Platnick, 1997 — Malaysia (mainland)
 L. tenuis Schwendinger, 1996 — Thailand
 L. thaleri Schwendinger, 2009 — Thailand
 L. tham Sedgwick & Schwendinger, 1990 — Thailand
 L. thoranie Schwendinger, 1996 — Thailand
 L. tioman Platnick & Sedgwick, 1984 — Malaysia (mainland)
 L. trang Platnick & Sedgwick, 1984 — Thailand
 L. yamasakii Ono, 1988 — Thailand
 L. yangae Platnick & Sedgwick, 1984 — Thailand, Malaysia

Qiongthela

Qiongthela Xu & Kuntner, 2015
 Q. australis (Ono, 2002) — Vietnam
 Q. baishensis Xu, 2015 (type) — China (Hainan)
 Q. baoting Yu, Liu, Zhang, Wang, Li & Xu, 2020 — China (Hainan)
 Q. bawang Xu, Liu, Kuntner & Li, 2017 — China (Hainan)
 Q. dongfang Yu, Liu, Zhang, Li & Xu, 2021 — China (Hainan)
 Q. jianfeng Xu, Liu, Kuntner & Li, 2017 — China (Hainan)
 Q. nankai Yu, Liu, Zhang, Li & Xu, 2021 — China (Hainan)
 Q. nui (Schwendinger & Ono, 2011) — Vietnam
 Q. qiongzhong Yu, Liu, Zhang, Wang, Li & Xu, 2020 — China (Hainan)
 Q. sanya Yu, Liu, Zhang, Wang, Li & Xu, 2020 — China (Hainan)
 Q. wuzhi Xu, Liu, Kuntner & Li, 2017 — China (Hainan)
 Q. yalin Yu, Liu, Zhang, Li & Xu, 2021 — China (Hainan)
 Q. yinae Xu, Liu, Kuntner & Li, 2017 — China (Hainan)
 Q. yinggezui Yu, Liu, Zhang, Wang, Li & Xu, 2020 — China (Hainan)

Ryuthela

Ryuthela Haupt, 1983
 R. banna Xu, Liu, Ono, Chen, Kuntner & Li, 2017 — Japan (Ryukyu Is.)
 R. henoko Xu, Liu, Ono, Chen, Kuntner & Li, 2017 — Japan (Ryukyu Is.)
 R. hirakubo Xu, Liu, Ono, Chen, Kuntner & Li, 2017 — Japan (Ryukyu Is.)
 R. iheyana Ono, 2002 — Japan (Ryukyu Is.)
 R. ishigakiensis Haupt, 1983 — Japan (Ryukyu Is.)
 R. kisenbaru Xu, Liu, Ono, Chen, Kuntner & Li, 2017 — Japan (Ryukyu Is.)
 R. motobu Xu, Liu, Ono, Chen, Kuntner & Li, 2017 — Japan (Ryukyu Is.)
 R. nago Xu, Liu, Ono, Chen, Kuntner & Li, 2017 — Japan (Ryukyu Is.)
 R. nishihirai (Haupt, 1979) (type) — Japan (Ryukyu Is.)
 R. owadai Ono, 1997 — Japan (Ryukyu Is.)
 R. sasakii Ono, 1997 — Japan (Ryukyu Is.)
 R. shimojanai Xu, Liu, Ono, Chen, Kuntner & Li, 2017 — Japan (Ryukyu Is.)
 R. tanikawai Ono, 1997 — Japan (Ryukyu Is.)
 R. unten Xu, Liu, Ono, Chen, Kuntner & Li, 2017 — Japan (Ryukyu Is.)
 R. yarabu Xu, Liu, Ono, Chen, Kuntner & Li, 2017 — Japan (Ryukyu Is.)

Sinothela

Sinothela Haupt, 2003
 S. heyangensis (Zhu & Wang, 1984) — China
 S. luotianensis (Yin, Tang, Zhao & Chen, 2002) — China
 S. schensiensis (Schenkel, 1953) — China
 S. sinensis (Bishop & Crosby, 1932) (type) — China

Songthela

Songthela Ono, 2000
 S. bristowei (Gertsch, 1967) — China
 S. ciliensis (Yin, Tang & Xu, 2003) — China
 S. goulouensis (Yin, 2001) — China
 S. hangzhouensis (Chen, Zhang & Zhu, 1981) (type) — China
 S. huangyang Li, Liu, Li & Xu, 2020 — China
 S. jianganensis (Chen, Gao, Zhu & Luo, 1988) — China
 S. mangshan (Bao, Yin & Xu, 2003) — China
 S. pluma Yu, Li & Zhang, 2018 — China
 S. pyriformis Li, Liu & Xu, 2019 — China
 S. sapana (Ono, 2010) — Vietnam
 S. shei (Xu & Yin, 2001) — China
 S. shuyuan Li, Liu & Xu, 2019 — China
 S. wosanensis (Wang & Jiao, 1995) — China
 S. xiangnan Li, Liu, Li & Xu, 2020 — China
 S. xianningensis (Yin, Tang, Zhao & Chen, 2002) — China
 S. yunnanensis (Song & Haupt, 1984) — China

Vinathela

Vinathela Ono, 2000
 V. abca (Ono, 1999) — Vietnam
 V. cucphuongensis (Ono, 1999) (type) — Vietnam
 V. hongkong (Song & Wu, 1997) — China (Hong Kong)
 V. hunanensis (Song & Haupt, 1984) — China
 V. nahang Logunov & Vahtera, 2017 — Vietnam
 V. nenglianggu Li, Liu & Xu, 2019 — China
 V. tomokunii (Ono, 1997) — Vietnam
 V. tonkinensis (Bristowe, 1933) — Vietnam

References

Liphistiidae